The following is a list of the awards and nominations received by the American science fiction television series Star Trek: The Original Series (1966–69).

Emmy Award

Hugo Awards

Saturn Award

TV Land Awards

Television Critics Association Awards

Writers Guild of America

See also
List of Star Trek: The Next Generation awards and nominations
List of Star Trek: Deep Space Nine awards and nominations
List of Star Trek: Voyager awards and nominations
List of Star Trek: Enterprise awards and nominations
List of Star Trek: Discovery awards and nominations

References

External links
 Awards for Star Trek: The Original Series at IMDb

Original
Awards